The Prix Patrick Dewaere is awarded annually to a young and upcoming actor working in the French film industry.

It was initiated in 2008 and is named after the French actor Patrick Dewaere (1947–1982). It replaced the Prix Jean Gabin which was awarded from 1981 to 2006. The prize is awarded by a jury each year in Paris in conjunction with the Prix Romy Schneider.

Recipients

References

External links
 
 

French film awards
Awards established in 2008